Peter Fraenkel, MBE, is a marine engineer, visiting professor at the University of Edinburgh School of Engineering and a fellow of the Institution of Mechanical Engineers and of the Energy Institute. He is the inventor of the tidal power plant SeaGen.

In 2013, Fraenkel won the Scottish Government's Saltire Prize medal.

He is also the founder of the company Gravitricity, to exploit his concept of suspending heavy weights in abandoned mine shafts to store energy. This promises to be half as expensive as large scale lithium batteries.

See also
Gravity battery

References

Living people
British marine engineers
Scottish mechanical engineers
Fellows of the Institution of Mechanical Engineers
Members of the Order of the British Empire
Year of birth missing (living people)